Johanna Karin Lind Bagge (born 13 October 1971) became Miss Sweden in 1993 and represented her country at Miss Universe where she was placed 16th overall during the preliminary. She won over the 1st runner-up and later Playboy model Victoria Silvstedt.

During her tenure as  Miss Sweden, Lind was also featured in Swedish media for her involvement in the Mae West Centenary celebration going on there.

In August 2018, Lind married music producer Anders Bagge.

References 

1971 births
Living people
Miss Sweden winners
Miss Universe 1993 contestants
Swedish female models
20th-century Swedish women